Tisiphone abeona, the swordgrass brown, is a nymphalid butterfly. It is endemic to Australia.

The wings of the adult are brown and have a wingspan of about 60 mm.

The larvae feed on Gahnia species.

Subspecies
 T. a. abeona (Donovan, 1805) (New South Wales, from the Hunter River south)
 T. a. albifascia Waterhouse, 1904 (eastern Victoria)
 T. a. antoni Tindale, 1947 (western Victoria to south-east Australia)
 T. a. aurelia Waterhouse, 1915 (New South Wales, from Camden Haven to Port Stevens)
 T. a. joanna (Butler, 1866) (New South Wales, Port Macquarie)
 T. a. morrisi Waterhouse, 1914 (Queensland, from Southport to New South Wales)
 T. a. rawnsleyi (Miskin, 1876) (Queensland, from Gympie to Caloundra)
 T. a. regalis Waterhouse, 1928 (New South Wales, from the Dorrigo Plateau to the Barrington Tops)

External links
Australian Caterpillars 
"Tisiphone Hübner, [1819]" at Markku Savela's Lepidoptera and Some Other Life Forms

Satyrini
Butterflies described in 1805